St. Paul's Church College is a school in Agra, Uttar Pradesh, India. It was established on 25 January 1980 by the Church of North India and is affiliated to the Council for the Indian School Certificate Examinations board of schools. The principal of the school is Vivek Daniels who replaced Veronica Carville.

Church of North India schools
Primary schools in Uttar Pradesh
High schools and secondary schools in Uttar Pradesh
Christian schools in Uttar Pradesh
Education in Agra
Educational institutions established in 1980
1980 establishments in Uttar Pradesh